Eternal Summer Original Soundtrack is the soundtrack album for the 2006 Taiwanese film Eternal Summer, starring Joseph Chang, Bryant Chang and Kate Yeung; and directed by Leste Chen. It was released on 12 December 2006 by Rock Records. The album features 23 musical scores. Three editions were released including the Preorder Edition and Regular Edition of which both include a CD and a VCD. Both of which contains "Eternal Summer" sung by Mayday and other songs by Fish Leong and Mayday.

Track listing

References

Film soundtracks
2007 soundtrack albums
Mandopop soundtracks